A number of steamships were named Heian Maru, including –

, a Japanese cargo ship in service 1924–26
, a Japanese cargo ship in service 1930–33
, a Japanese cargo ship in service 1917–45 or later

Ship names